Kuntur Jipiña (Aymara kunturi condor, jipiña squatting of animals, 'where the condor crouches', Hispanicized spelling Condor Jipina) is a mountain in the Cordillera Real in the Andes of Bolivia, about  high. It is located in the La Paz Department, at the border of the Larecaja Province, Guanay Municipality, and the Los Andes Province, Batallas Municipality. It lies west of the mountain Chachakumani and south-east of Wila Wila. The lakes Janq'u Quta and Jist'aña Quta are situated north-east and north-west of Kuntur Jipiña.

References 

Mountains of La Paz Department (Bolivia)